Nigorella hirsuta is a jumping spider species in the genus Nigorella that lives in South Africa and Zimbabwe.

References

Salticidae
Arthropods of Zimbabwe
Spiders of Africa
Spiders of South Africa
Spiders described in 2009
Taxa named by Wanda Wesołowska